Checkmath is a board game published in 1968 by Grant Trading.

Contents
Checkmath is a game in which numbered counters are placed at opposite ends of a ten by ten squared board, and the object is to take the opponent's pieces by landing on the square occupied by an opponent's piece.

Reception
Eric Solomon reviewed Checkmath for Games International magazine, and gave it 2 stars out of 5, and stated that "Checkmath is one of those games which an educationalist might applaud, but it bored me stiff. I will concede that it might be a good idea to play it several times with a six year old child, but after the age of seven it should be used only as punishment."

References

Board games introduced in 1968